Cota Creek is a very minor tributary of the Upper Mississippi River. It is confined mainly to Taylor Township in Allamakee County, Iowa, United States. It joins the river at Harpers Ferry, downstream from Lock and Dam No. 9.

See also
List of rivers of Iowa

Sources

cLocations with map

Tributaries of the Mississippi River
Rivers of Allamakee County, Iowa
Rivers of Iowa